Germán Mera Cáceres (born March 5, 1990) is a Colombian footballer who plays as a defender for Atlético Junior. Born in the city of Cali, he has also played for Córdoba, Atlético La Sabana, Deportivo Pasto, Colorado Rapids, Bucaramanga, Deportivo Cali, Club Brugge, and KV Mechelen. While at Mechelen he scored the winning goal in the 2019 Belgian Cup Final.

Honours
Mechelen
 Belgian Cup: 2018–19

References

1990 births
Living people
Footballers from Cali
Colombian footballers
Colombian expatriate footballers
Categoría Primera A players
Categoría Primera B players
Major League Soccer players
Belgian Pro League players
Deportivo Cali footballers
Atlético La Sabana footballers
Deportivo Pasto footballers
Colorado Rapids players
Atlético Bucaramanga footballers
Club Brugge KV players
K.V. Mechelen players
Atlético Junior footballers
Association football defenders
Colombian expatriate sportspeople in the United States
Colombian expatriate sportspeople in Belgium
Expatriate soccer players in the United States
Expatriate footballers in Belgium